Germany sent 20 competitors to compete in four disciplines at the 2010 Winter Paralympics in Vancouver, British Columbia, Canada. They placed first overall in the medal standings with a total of 13 gold medals.

Alpine skiing 

The Alpine Ski Team from Germany won a total of 15 medals. The medalists are:

  Martin Braxenthaler - Men's Super Combined, sitting
  Martin Braxenthaler - Men's Giant Slalom, sitting
  Martin Braxenthaler - Men's Slalom, sitting
  Gerd Schönfelder - Men's Super Combined, standing
  Gerd Schönfelder - Men's Super G, standing
  Gerd Schönfelder - Men's Downhill, standing
  Gerd Schönfelder - Men's Giant Slalom, standing
  Martin Braxenthaler - Men's Super G, sitting
  Gerd Schönfelder - Men's Slalom, standing
  Andrea Rothfuss - Women's Giant Slalom, standing
  Andrea Rothfuss - Women's Slalom, standing
  Andrea Rothfuss - Women's Super G, standing
  Andrea Rothfuss - Women's Downhill, standing
  Anna Schaffelhuber - Women's Super G, sitting
  Gerd Gradwohl - Men's Downhill, visually impaired

Biathlon 

The Biathlon team from Germany won a total of 5 medals at the 2010 Winter Paralympics. The medalists are:

 Verena Bentele Women's 12.5 km, visually impaired
 Verena Bentele Women's 3 km, visually impaired
 Wilhelm Brem Men's 12.5 km, visually impaired
 Josef Giesen Men's 12.5 km, standing
 Andrea Eskau Women's 10 km, sitting

Cross-country skiing 

The German athletes participating in the Cross-country skiing events won a total of 4 medals. The medalists are:

 Verena Bentele Women's 1 km sprint classic, visually impaired
 Verena Bentele Women's 5 km classic, visually impaired
 Verena Bentele Women's 15 km free, visually impaired
 Andrea Eskau Women's 5 km, sitting

Wheelchair curling 

Germany competed in wheelchair curling. They placed last, with a score of 3-6, equaling the teams from Great Britain, Switzerland, Norway and Japan. Their results are:

See also
Germany at the 2010 Winter Olympics
Germany at the Paralympics

References

External links
Vancouver 2010 Paralympic Games official website
International Paralympic Committee official website

Nations at the 2010 Winter Paralympics
2010
Paralympics